Karyakino is a rural locality (a village) in Vtorovskoye Rural Settlement, Kameshkovsky District, Vladimir Oblast, Russia. The population was 21 as of 2010.

Geography 
Karyakino is located 34 km southwest of Kameshkovo (the district's administrative centre) by road. Nesterkovo is the nearest rural locality.

References 

Rural localities in Kameshkovsky District